Haemoproteus columbae is a species of parasitic eukaryote that infects bee-eaters.

References

Parasites of birds
Haemosporida